The AD Flying Boat was designed by the British Admiralty's Air Department to serve as a patrol aircraft that could operate in conjunction with Royal Navy warships. Intended for use during the First World War, production of the aircraft was terminated as the end of the war came into sight, and the type saw little operational use. A number were repurchased after the end of the war by Supermarine Aviation and rebuilt as civil transports, becoming known as the Supermarine Channel.

Design and development
Designed in 1915 by the British yacht designer Linton Hope, the aircraft was of conventional biplane flying-boat configuration, and also featured a biplane tail with twin rudders. The pilot and observer sat in tandem in the nose, with the engine and pusher propeller mounted behind them, between the wings. The wings could be folded forwards to facilitate shipboard stowage.

Two prototypes were constructed in 1916 by Pemberton-Billing Ltd (later to become Supermarine Aviation Works). The first prototype was intended to be powered by a 150 hp (112 kW) Sunbeam Nubian engine, but as this was not ready to use, a  Hispano-Suiza 8 was substituted. The aircraft performed poorly both on the water and in the air, demonstrating severe fore and aft vibration during take-off, while subject to excessive yaw during flight. After these problems were solved by producing revised versions of the hull, and the fin and rudder, the AD Flying Boat was able to be ordered into production. A total of 80 aircraft were ordered, and 27 machines were built. Examples were tested with Sunbeam Arab and Wolseley Python engines.

Supermarine Channel

Following the Armistice, Supermarine purchased 19 of these AD Flying Boats to modify them for the civil market as the Supermarine Channel. The Channel I was powered with a  Beardmore 160 hp engines, and the Channel II was fitted with a  Armstrong Siddeley Puma engine. The reconfigured flying-boats provided accommodation for a pilot and three passengers in three open cockpits.

Operators

Military operators
 
Chilean Air Force - One aircraft.
Chilean Navy acquired one Channel with modified hull (similar to the Supermarine Seal II) in 1922.
 
Imperial Japanese Navy purchased three Channels.
 
 Royal Norwegian Navy Air Service purchased four Beardmore engined Channels in 1920, acquiring a further ex-civil aircraft. One remained in service until 1928. 
 
 Royal Swedish Navy purchased a single Channel in 1921, it being destroyed during testing.
 
 Royal Navy
 Royal Naval Air Service operated AD Flying Boat.

Civil operators
 
 Det Norske Luftfartsrederi, Channel Mk I

Specifications (AD Flying Boat)

See also
 Sempill Mission

References

Sources

 
 
 
 

Flying Boat
1910s British patrol aircraft
Single-engined pusher aircraft
Flying boats
Supermarine aircraft
Biplanes
Aircraft first flown in 1916